The 1989 college football season may refer to:

 1989 NCAA Division I-A football season
 1989 NCAA Division I-AA football season
 1989 NCAA Division II football season
 1989 NCAA Division III football season
 1989 NAIA Division I football season
 1989 NAIA Division II football season